Cnemaspis rammalensis, also known as the Rammale day gecko, is a species of gecko endemic to Sri Lanka.

Description
It is the largest species of day gecko recorded from Sri Lanka with snout-vent length of 52–54 mm. Precloacal pores absent. There are five prominent trilobate shaped creamy markings.

Scalation: ventrals 186–207. 15 femoral pores on each side. 22–23 and 23–25 subdigital lamellae.

Habitat
It is a rock dwelling species. Type locality is Rammalakanda Forest. Populations are decreased due to heavy deforestation.

References

Cnemaspis
Reptiles described in 2014